The Evangelical Church, Nekielka is a neo-gothic church in Nekielka, Września County, Poland. The church has been on the national heritage list since 1999.

History 
The church was first built in the village of Nekielka by Hauländer settlers in 1754. The church was a religious center not only to the settlers but also to residents of nearby villages. In 1881 the original building was demolished and rebuilt in a neo-gothic style. The new building was consecrated in October 1884 and later renovated in 1907. During World War II the church used to store weapons; and after the war, it was used as warehouse. In 1992 Tschurl-Karen family purchased the building. Later, In 2005, a commemorative plaque was placed in the church to commemorate the area's early Hauländer settlers. Photo of the Church plaque - "Lutheran Brothers settled here 1749"

The current function
Currently, the building serves as the church hall.

Gallery

Gmina Nekla
Nekielka
Lutheran churches in Poland